Lee Hyun-Woong (born April 27, 1988) is a South Korean football player who plays for Gyeongnam FC .

External links
 

1988 births
Living people
Association football forwards
South Korean footballers
Daejeon Hana Citizen FC players
Suwon Samsung Bluewings players
Gimcheon Sangmu FC players
Gyeongnam FC players
FC Anyang players
K League 1 players
K League 2 players
Yonsei University alumni
Association football midfielders